Orders (known in the United States as: Orderers) is a 1974 Quebec historical drama film about the incarceration of innocent civilians during the 1970 October Crisis and the War Measures Act enacted by the Canadian government of Pierre Trudeau. It is the second film by director Michel Brault. It features entertainer and Senator Jean Lapointe.

Plot
The film tells the story of five of those incarcerated civilians. It is scripted but is inspired by a number of interviews with actual prisoners made during the events and its style is heavily inspired by the Quebec school of Cinéma vérité. It is a docufiction.

Cast 
 Hélène Loiselle as Marie Boudreau
 Jean Lapointe as Clermont Boudreau
 Guy Provost as Dr. Jean-Marie Beauchemin
 Claude Gauthier as Richard Lavoie
 Louise Forestier as Claudette Dusseault
Louise Pratte as Louise Boudreau
Martine Pratte as Martine Boudreau
Monique Pratte as Monique Boudreau
Amulette Garneau as Mrs. Thibault, The Neighbour
 Louise Latraverse as Claire Beauchemin
 Sophie Clément as Ginette Lavoie
 Esther Auger as Esther
 Claire Richard as Mrs. Vezina
 J. Léo Gagnon as The Grocer
 José Rettino as The Foreman

Awards 
It shared a Cannes Film Festival Award in 1975 and four Canadian Film Awards (predecessor of the Genie Awards) the same year. It was also selected as the Canadian entry for the Best Foreign Language Film at the 48th Academy Awards, but was not accepted as a nominee. The film was selected to be screened in the Cannes Classics section of the 2015 Cannes Film Festival.
 1975 Cannes Film Festival, won for Best Director (Michel Brault, tied with Costa Gavras for Section spéciale)
 1975 Cannes Film Festival, nominated for Golden Palm (Michel Brault)
 1975 Canadian Film Awards, won for Best Feature Film (Claude Godbout and Bernard Lalonde)
 1975 Canadian Film Awards, won for Film of the Year (Claude Godbout and Bernard Lalonde)
 1975 Canadian Film Awards, won for Best Original Script (Michel Brault)
 1975 Canadian Film Awards, won for Best Direction (Michel Brault)
 The Toronto International Film Festival ranked it in the Top 10 Canadian Films of All Time four times, in 1984, 1993, 2004 and 2015.

See also 
 Docufiction
 List of docufiction films
List of Quebec films
Cinema of Quebec
Culture of Quebec
Quebec independence movement
History of Quebec
List of submissions to the 48th Academy Awards for Best Foreign Language Film
List of Canadian submissions for the Academy Award for Best Foreign Language Film

References

External links
 Canada’s Ten Best film surveys
 Canadian Film Encyclopedia
 
 

1974 films
1970s French-language films
Canadian films based on actual events
Canadian black-and-white films
Films directed by Michel Brault
October Crisis
1970s political drama films
Films set in Montreal
Best Picture Genie and Canadian Screen Award winners
Canadian docufiction films
Canadian political drama films
French-language Canadian films
1970s Canadian films